Figure for Landscape is a bronze sculpture by Barbara Hepworth, modeled in 1960.

Seven castings were made; they are in the Barbara Hepworth Museum (Tate St Ives), Hirshhorn Museum and Sculpture Garden, Yorkshire Sculpture Park, University of Exeter, J. Paul Getty Museum, San Diego Museum of Art. and Stavanger Kunstforening, Norway.

The sculpture in Stavanger was placed outside Stavanger Kunstforening in 1965, when Dame Hepworth decided to sell it at less than half price to ensure that one of her works was placed in Norway. In the spring of 2014 the Stavanger Kunstforening decided to sell the sculpture to improve their financial situation, a decision which has created an uproar in the city of Stavanger. The sculpture was sold at Auction by Christie's to a client of Stephen Ongpin, a London art dealer, for $4.17 million including commission

See also
 List of public art in Washington, D.C., Ward 2

References

External links
"Barbara Hepworth", Hirshhorn Museum
"Barbara Hepworth;Joseph H. Hirshhorn", Time Life, Getty Images

Sculptures by Barbara Hepworth
1960 sculptures
Modernist sculpture
Bronze sculptures in the United Kingdom
Bronze sculptures in California
Bronze sculptures in Norway
Bronze sculptures in Washington, D.C.
Outdoor sculptures in England
Outdoor sculptures in Greater Los Angeles
Outdoor sculptures in Washington, D.C.
Sculptures of the Smithsonian Institution
Hirshhorn Museum and Sculpture Garden
J. Paul Getty Museum
Outdoor sculptures in San Diego